Gilly Hicks is a lingerie brand owned by Abercrombie & Fitch, specializing in women's intimates and loungewear. It competes primarily with Victoria's Secret, Victoria's Secret PINK, and aerie.

Its first store opened at Natick Mall in Natick, Massachusetts on January 21, 2008. On November 6, 2013, Abercrombie & Fitch announced it would close Gilly Hicks' retail stores, but continue the brand's online operations. Gilly Hicks was resurrected in 2017 due to customer demand focusing in younger women. Since then, its products have been sold in all Hollister stores and online. As of 2019, Gilly Hicks is a popular seller on the Hollister e-commerce site and in its retail stores.

Stores

In July 2019, Abercrombie & Fitch opened four Gilly Hicks pop-up stores. The stores, which were located at BrandBox in Tysons Corner Center (Tysons, VA), Dolphin Mall (Miami, FL), Los Cerritos Center (Cerritos, CA), and Baybrook Mall (Friendswood, TX), joined two existing Gilly Hicks stores at Ala Moana Center (Honolulu, HI) and Roosevelt Field Mall (East Garden City, NY).

In October 2019, Gilly Hicks opened a side by side location at the Hollister Co. at the Aventura Mall (Aventura, FL).

In July 2021, Gilly Hicks opened a new side by side location at Westfield London. The location features the brand's recently expanded product assortment, new store format and various digital experiences.

In February 2022, Abercrombie & Fitch confirmed a new Gilly Hicks location would open in Carnaby Street, London.

References

Abercrombie & Fitch brands
Lingerie brands
Underwear brands
Australian-themed retailers
Clothing companies established in 2008
Retail companies established in 2008
2000s fashion
2010s fashion
Products introduced in 2008
Clothing brands of the United States
Clothing retailers of the United States